Pinellas Academy of Math and Science (PAMS) is a charter-public school in Clearwater, Pinellas County, Florida,  United States.

Schools in Pinellas County, Florida